A Moveable Feast is a 1964 memoir belles-lettres by American author Ernest Hemingway about his years as a struggling expat journalist and writer in Paris during the 1920s. It was published posthumously. The book details Hemingway's first marriage to Hadley Richardson and his associations with other cultural figures of the Lost Generation in Interwar France.

The memoir consists of various personal accounts by Hemingway and involves many notable figures of the time, such as Sylvia Beach, Hilaire Belloc, Bror von Blixen-Finecke, Aleister Crowley, John Dos Passos, F. Scott and Zelda Fitzgerald, Ford Madox Ford, James Joyce, Wyndham Lewis, Pascin, Ezra Pound, Evan Shipman, Gertrude Stein, Alice B. Toklas, and Hermann von Wedderkop. The work also references the addresses of specific locations such as bars, cafes, and hotels, many of which can still be found in Paris today.

Ernest Hemingway's suicide in July 1961 delayed the publication of the book due to copyright issues and several edits which were made to the final draft. The memoir was published posthumously in 1964, three years after Hemingway's death, by his fourth wife and widow, Mary Hemingway, based upon his original manuscripts and notes. An edition altered and revised by his grandson, Seán Hemingway, was published in 2009.

Background
In November 1956, Hemingway recovered two small steamer trunks that he had stored in March 1928 in the basement of the Hôtel Ritz Paris. The trunks contained notebooks he had filled during the 1920s. Hemingway's friend and biographer A. E. Hotchner, who was with him in Paris in 1956, later recounted the occasion of Hemingway's recovery of the trunks and notebooks:

Having recovered his trunks, Hemingway had the notebooks transcribed, and then began working them up into the memoir that would eventually become A Moveable Feast. After Hemingway's death in 1961, his widow Mary Hemingway, in her capacity as his literary executor, made final copy-edits to the manuscript prior to its publication in 1964. In a "Note" with which she prefaced the posthumously published 1964 edition of the work, she wrote:

Gerry Brenner, a literary scholar at the University of Montana, and other researchers have examined Hemingway's notes and the initial drafts of A Moveable Feast, which are in the collection of Ernest Hemingway's personal papers opened to the public in 1979, following the completion of the John F. Kennedy Library, where they are held in Boston. In a paper titled "Are We Going to Hemingway's Feast?" (1982), Brenner undertook to document Mary Hemingway's editing process and questioned its validity. He concluded that some of her changes were misguided, and others derived from questionable motives.  He also suggested that the changes appeared to contradict Mary's stated policy for her role as executor, which had been to maintain a "hands off" approach. Brenner states that Mary changed the order of the chapters in Hemingway's final draft, apparently to "preserve chronology". This change interrupted the series of juxtaposed character sketches of such individuals as Sylvia Beach, owner of the bookstore Shakespeare and Company, and Gertrude Stein. The chapter titled "Birth of a New School", which Hemingway had dropped from his draft, was reinserted by Mary. Brenner alleges the most serious change was the deletion of Hemingway's lengthy apology to his first wife, Hadley. This apology appeared in various forms in every draft of the book. Brenner suggests that Mary deleted it because it impugned her own role as his wife.

In contrast, Hotchner has said that he received a near final draft of A Moveable Feast in 1959, and that the version Mary Hemingway published is essentially the draft he had read then. In his view, the original 1964 publication is the version that Hemingway intended, and Mary Hemingway did not revise or add chapters on her own initiative, but simply carried out Ernest's intentions. Hotchner describes Hemingway's memoir as "a serious work", that Hemingway "certainly intended it for publication", and contends: "Because Mary was busy with matters relating to Ernest’s estate, she had little involvement with the book.... What I read on the plane coming back from Cuba [in 1959] was essentially what was published. There was no extra chapter created by Mary.

Source of title

The title of A Moveable Feast (a play on words for the term used for a holy day for which the date is not fixed) was suggested by Hemingway's friend and biographer A. E. Hotchner, who remembered Hemingway using the term in 1950. Hotchner's recollection of what Hemingway had said became the source of the epigraph on the title page for the posthumously published work in 1964.

The term had also been used earlier (1946) in a non-religious context in an English translation of the novel The Stranger by Albert Camus: "Masson remarked that we’d had a very early lunch, but really lunch was a movable feast, you had it when you felt like it."

Chapters

The 1964 edition of Hemingway's Paris memoir consists of a "Preface" by Hemingway (pg. ix), a "Note" by his widow (pg. xi), and 20 chapters, or individual parts or sections. Each of the chapters can be read as a stand-alone piece or entity, not dependent upon the context of the whole work, nor necessarily arranged in any chronological order—with titles descriptive of the subject matter of each, as follows:

 "A Good Café on the Place St.-Michel"
 "Miss Stein Instructs"
 "Une Génération Perdue"
 "Shakespeare and Company"
 "People of the Seine"
 "A False Spring"
 "The End of an Avocation"
 "Hunger Was Good Discipline"
 "Ford Madox Ford and the Devil's Disciple"
 "Birth of a New School"
 "With Pascin at the Dôme"
 "Ezra Pound and His Bel Esprit"
 "A Strange Enough Ending"
 "The Man Who Was Marked for Death"
 "Evan Shipman at the Lilas"
 "An Agent of Evil"
 "Scott Fitzgerald"
 "Hawks Do Not Share"
 "A Matter of Measurements"
 "There Is Never Any End to Paris"

Publishing history

The first published edition was edited from Hemingway's manuscripts and notes by his fourth wife and widow, Mary Hemingway, and published posthumously in 1964, three years after Hemingway's death.

In 2009 a new edition, titled the "Restored Edition", was published by Seán Hemingway, assistant curator at the Metropolitan Museum of Art and grandson of Hemingway and Pauline Pfeiffer. He made numerous changes:
 The previous introductory letter by Hemingway, pieced together from various fragments by Mary Hemingway, was removed.
 The chapter called "Birth of a New School" and large sections of "Ezra Pound and the Measuring Worm" and "There is Never Any End to Paris" (which has been renamed as "Winter in Schruns" and moved to chapter 16) had sections previously left out that have been re-added. The unpublished "The Pilot Fish and the Rich" has been added.
 Chapter 7 ("Shakespeare and Company") has been moved to be chapter 3, and chapter 16 ("Nada y Pues Nada") has been moved to the end of the book as an "Additional Paris Sketch".
 Hemingway's use of the second person has been restored in many places, a change which Seán asserts "brings the reader into the story".

From the new foreword by Patrick Hemingway:

"[H]ere is the last bit of professional writing by my father, the true foreword to A Moveable Feast: 'This book contains material from the remises of my memory and of my heart.  Even if the one has been tampered with and the other does not exist'."

Reception

Preserved video of two critical reactions from 1964 
The basic cable channel GSN has rebroadcast the kinescope of an appearance that Sheilah Graham made on the American television show What's My Line? 23 years after the death of her boyfriend F. Scott Fitzgerald. She appeared on an episode that was telecast live on CBS on June 7, 1964, when A Moveable Feast was on bestseller lists.  Graham appeared on the show to promote a book she had written, and she did not bring up A Moveable Feast.

Bennett Cerf, the head of Random House publishing who was also a regular panelist on the network television series, initiated talk of Hemingway's new bestselling book.  Cerf, who was two years younger than Fitzgerald and one year older than Hemingway, had the following exchange with Graham, according to the kinescope of the telecast that is available for viewing on YouTube.

Reactions to the 2009 edition 

A.E. Hotchner alleged, among his other criticisms of the 2009 edition, that Seán Hemingway had edited it, in part, to exclude references to his grandmother (Hemingway's second wife Pauline Pfeiffer) that he found less than flattering. As Hotchner's over-all assessment of the 2009 edition, he wrote: "Ernest was very protective of the words he wrote, words that gave the literary world a new style of writing. Surely he has the right to have these words protected against frivolous incursion, like this reworked volume that should be called “A Moveable Book”.

Other critics also have found fault with some of Seán Hemingway's editorial changes. Irene Gammel writes about the new edition: "Ethically and pragmatically, restoring an author's original intent is a slippery slope when the published text has stood the test of time and when edits have been approved by authors or their legal representatives." Pointing to the complexity of authorship, she concludes: “Mary's version should be considered the definitive one, while the 'restored' version provides access to important unpublished contextual sources that illuminate the evolution of the 1964 edition.”

Legacy

Adaptations
On September 15, 2009, Variety reported that Mariel Hemingway, a granddaughter of Ernest Hemingway and his first wife, had acquired the film and television rights to the memoir with American film producer John Goldstone. In 2019, it was reported that a television series was being developed through Village Roadshow Entertainment Group, but there was no planned release date.

Cultural references

In films
 The comedy film The Moderns (1988) brings the characters of A Moveable Feast to life while spoofing the pretense of the Lost Generation.
 The book is featured in the movie, City of Angels (1998), during an exchange between Nicolas Cage and Meg Ryan.
 Woody Allen's 2011 film Midnight in Paris is set in the Paris of the 1920s as portrayed in Hemingway's book, and the movie features the Owen Wilson character interacting with the likes of Hemingway, Gertrude Stein, and F. Scott and Zelda Fitzgerald, and uses the phrase "a moveable feast" in two instances.
 The Words (2012) uses an excerpt from A Moveable Feast to represent a book manuscript found in an old messenger bag.
 In the American superhero film, Captain America: The Winter Soldier (2014), one of the books on the shelf in the character Steve Rogers' apartment is Hemingway's A Moveable Feast.
 In the American film, French Postcards (1979), a character quotes the epigraph from the book in order to convince a fellow American student who is studying in France with him to not only study, but enjoy life in Paris.
 In the American comedy film, Harold & Kumar Escape from Guantanamo Bay (2008), a stripper named Tits Hemingway says she got the latter part of her name because her favorite novel is A Moveable Feast.

In literature
 The writer Enrique Vila-Matas named his book Never Any End to Paris (2003) after the final chapter of Hemingway's work.

In stage performances
 In his early stand-up performances in the late 1960s, Woody Allen performed a routine wherein he riffed the feel of the then recently published book while describing imaginary times spent with Hemingway, the Fitzgeralds, and Gertrude Stein with the repeated punch line: "And Hemingway punched me in the mouth."

Revival in France
Following the November 13, 2015, terrorist attacks in Paris,  A Moveable Feast became a bestseller in France. In the context of the attacks, the book's French-language title, Paris est une fête, was a potent symbol of defiance and celebration. Bookstore sales of the volume surged, and copies of the book became a common fixture among the flowers and candles in makeshift memorials created by Parisians across the city to honor victims of the attacks.

Hemingway's wine 
In his memoir, A Moveable Feast, Hemingway shows what life was like for aspiring writers in Paris. He talks about his friendships with Scott Fitzgerald and Gertrude Stein, his first marriage and their life in the Latin Quarter, and his writing routine in Parisian cafes. His love of good wine shines through as he never fails to mention which wine he enjoyed with his friends and what they ate with it. Wine was entirely entwined with the writer's lifestyle in Paris.

 Sancerre: A False Spring, "Another day later that year when we had come back from one of our voyages and had good luck at some track again we stopped at Prunier's on the way home, going in to sit at the bar after looking at the clearly priced wonders in the window. We had oysters and crab mexicane with glasses of Sancerre."
 Mâcon: Scott Fitzgerald, "We had a marvellous lunch from the hotel at Lyon, an excellent truffled roast chicken, delicious bread and white Mâcon wine and Scott was very happy when we drank the white Maconnais at each of our stops. At Mâcon I had bought four more bottles of excellent wine which I uncorked as we needed them."
Corsican: With Pascin at the Dôme, "At home, over the sawmill, we had a Corsican wine that had a great authority and a low price. It was a very Corsican wine and you could dilute it by half with water and still receive its message."
 Cahors: With Pascin at the Dôme, "At the Negre de Toulouse we drank the good Cahors wine from the quarter, the half or the full carafe, usually diluting it about one-third with water.[...] In Paris, then, you could live very well on almost nothing and by skipping meals occasionally and never buying any new clothes, you could save and have luxuries."

In September 2020, Chiswick Book Festival featured a wine and literature event celebrating Hemingway's wine in A Moveable Feast presented by Victoria Daskal.

References

Bibliography

Further reading

 
 
  [This review's online title is "Hemingway's libidinous feast"]

External links

 
 Timeless Hemingway website

1964 non-fiction books
Books by Ernest Hemingway
Books published posthumously
Charles Scribner's Sons books
Cultural depictions of Ezra Pound
Cultural depictions of F. Scott Fitzgerald
Cultural depictions of Gertrude Stein
Ford Madox Ford
Literary memoirs